is a popular Japanese breakfast food consisting of cooked Japanese rice topped or mixed with raw egg and soy sauce.

Background 
Tamago kake gohan is a dish in which a raw egg is put on top of or mixed with rice, or a recipe for such a dish. Beaten eggs are sometimes used, as are non-beaten. Sometimes only the yolk of the egg is used.

The dish is known in Japan as "tamago kake gohan" (gohan means rice or food and kake means splashed or dashed), "tamago kake meshi" (meshi means rice or food), "tamago gohan", or simply "tamago kake". Tamago (egg) may be written  (cooked egg), as an alternative to the single character  (raw egg).

Method of preparation 

A raw egg and Japanese rice are simply mixed in the rice bowl. The rice may be cold, recently cooked or reheated; the egg may be broken directly into the rice bowl (before or after the rice), or beaten in a separate bowl beforehand. Some people dig a "well" in the mound of rice to pour the egg into.

References

See also

Omurice
Japanese cuisine
List of egg dishes

Japanese cuisine
Egg dishes
Japanese rice dishes